William Francis Nighy (born 12 December 1949) is an English actor. He started his career with the Everyman Theatre, Liverpool and made his London debut with the Royal National Theatre starting with The Illuminatus! in 1977. There he gained acclaim for his roles in David Hare's Pravda in 1985, Harold Pinter's Betrayal in 1991, Tom Stoppard's Arcadia in 1993, and Anton Chekov's The Seagull in 1994. He received a Laurence Olivier Award for Best Actor nomination for his performance in Blue/Orange in 2001. He made his Broadway debut in Hare's The Vertical Hour in 2006, and returned in the 2015 revival of Hare's Skylight earning a Tony Award for Best Actor in a Play nomination.

His early film roles include the comedies Still Crazy (1998) and Blow Dry (1999). His breakout role was in Love Actually (2003), which earned him a BAFTA Award for Best Supporting Actor. He soon gained recognition portraying Davy Jones in the Pirates of the Caribbean film series (2006–2007), and Viktor in the Underworld film series (2003–2009). His other films include Shaun of the Dead (2004), The Hitchhiker's Guide to the Galaxy (2005), The Constant Gardener (2005), Notes on a Scandal (2006), Hot Fuzz (2007), Valkyrie (2008), Harry Potter and the Deathly Hallows – Part 1 (2010), The Best Exotic Marigold Hotel (2012), About Time (2013), Emma (2020), and Living (2022), the last of which earned him a nomination for the Academy Award for Best Actor.

Nighy has gained acclaim for his roles in television earning a British Academy Television Award for Best Actor for his performance in BBC One series State of Play (2003), and a Golden Globe Award for Best Actor for the BBC film Gideon's Daughter (2007). He's also known for his roles in HBO's The Girl in the Café (2006) and PBS's Page Eight (2012).

Early life and education
Nighy was born in Caterham, Surrey. His mother, Catherine Josephine Nighy (née Whittaker), was a psychiatric nurse of Irish descent born in Glasgow, Scotland; and his English father, Alfred Martin Nighy, managed a car garage after working in the family chimney sweeping business.

Nighy was brought up as a Roman Catholic and served as an altar boy. He has two older siblings, Martin and Anna. He attended the John Fisher School, a Roman Catholic grammar school in Purley, where he was a member of the school theatre group. After leaving the school with two O-levels, he worked as a messenger for The Croydon Advertiser. He entered the Guildford School of Acting to train for stage and film.

Career

Early work 
After two seasons at the Everyman Theatre, Liverpool, Nighy made his London stage debut at the National Theatre in an epic staging of Ken Campbell and Chris Langham's Illuminatus!, which opened the new Cottesloe Theatre on 4 March 1977. He was cast to appear in two David Hare premieres, also at the National. During the 1980s, he appeared in several television productions, among them Hitler's SS: Portrait in Evil with John Shea and Tony Randall.

Nighy has starred in many radio and television dramas, notably the BBC serial The Men's Room (1991). He claimed that the serial, an Ann Oakley novel adapted by Laura Lamson, was the job that launched his career. More recently he has appeared in the thriller State of Play (2003) and the costume drama He Knew He Was Right (2004).

He played Samwise Gamgee in the 1981 BBC Radio dramatisation of The Lord of the Rings (credited as William Nighy), and was heard in the 1980s BBC Radio versions of Yes Minister episodes. He starred with Stephen Moore and Lesley Sharp in the acclaimed short radio drama Kerton's Story, written by James Woolf, which first aired in 1996. He had a starring role in the 2002 return of Auf Wiedersehen, Pet, portraying crooked politician Jeffrey Grainger. He has also made a guest appearance in the BBC Radio 4 series Baldi.

National Theatre 
He made his National Theatre debut with The Illuminatus! in 1977.
There he steadily gained acclaim with his performances in David Hare's Pravda in 1985, William Shakespeare's King Lear in 1986, Harold Pinter's Betrayal in 1991, and Anton Chekov's The Seagull in 1994. At the National Theatre, he acted in productions alongside Anthony Hopkins, Judi Dench, Harriet Walter, Rufus Sewell, and Chiwetel Ejiofor. Nighy's most acclaimed stage performances were in National Theatre productions. As Bernard Nightingale, an unscrupulous university don, in Tom Stoppard's Arcadia (1993), he engaged in witty exchanges with Felicity Kendal, who played Hannah Jarvis, an author.

He played a consultant psychiatrist in Joe Penhall's Blue/Orange (2000), for which he received an Olivier Award nomination for Best Actor; it transferred to the West End at the Duchess Theatre the following year. In 1997, Nighy starred as restaurant entrepreneur Tom Sergeant in David Hare's Skylight, which had premiered in 1995 and was moved to the Vaudeville Theatre.

Film and television 
Nighy played a libidinous young disc jockey, Vincent Fish, in the 1980 comedy series Agony, where he was the occasional lover of the lead character, played by Maureen Lipman.

Nighy received some recognition by American audiences for his acclaimed portrayal of overaged rock star Ray Simms in the 1998 film Still Crazy. In 1999 he gained further prominence in the UK with the starring role in "The Photographer", an episode of the award-winning BBC-TV mockumentary comedy series People Like Us, playing Will Rushmore, a middle aged man who has abandoned his career and family in the deluded belief that he can achieve success as a commercial photographer.

In 2003, Nighy played the role of the Vampire Elder Viktor in the American production Underworld. He returned in the same role in the sequel Underworld: Evolution in 2006, and again in the prequel Underworld: Rise of the Lycans in 2009. In February 2004, he was awarded the BAFTA Film Award for Best Supporting Actor for his role as Billy Mack in Love Actually. At the BAFTA Television Awards in April 2004, he won the Best Actor award for State of Play. He also appeared in the comedy Shaun of the Dead.

In early 2004, The Sunday Times reported that Nighy was on the shortlist for the role of the Ninth Doctor in the 2005 revival of the BBC television series Doctor Who. Christopher Eccleston ultimately filled the role.

In 2005, he appeared as Slartibartfast in the film adaptation of The Hitchhiker's Guide to the Galaxy. He also appeared in the one-off BBC One comedy-drama The Girl in the Café. In February 2006, he appeared in scriptwriter Stephen Poliakoff's one-off drama, Gideon's Daughter. Nighy played the lead character, Gideon, a successful events organiser who begins to lose touch with the world around him. This performance won him a Golden Globe Award for Best Actor in a Mini-series or TV Film in January 2007. Also in 2006, Nighy made his Broadway debut at the Music Box Theatre alongside Julianne Moore in The Vertical Hour, directed by Sam Mendes.

In 2006, Nighy played the principal villain, Davy Jones, in Pirates of the Caribbean: Dead Man's Chest, with his face entirely obscured by computer-generated makeup. He voiced the character with a Scots accent. He reprised the role in the 2007 sequel, Pirates of the Caribbean: At World's End, in which his real face was briefly revealed in one scene. He also provided the narration for the Animal Planet series Meerkat Manor. In 2006 he played the role of Richard Hart in Notes on a Scandal, for which he was nominated for a London Film Critics' Circle award. Nighy also appeared as General Friedrich Olbricht, one of the principal conspirators, in the 2008 film Valkyrie. He had played an SS officer in the 1985 Hitler's SS: Portrait in Evil. He starred in the film Wild Target in 2010.

In July 2009, he announced that he would play Rufus Scrimgeour in Harry Potter and the Deathly Hallows – Part 1. Nighy had already worked with director David Yates twice, and with the majority of the Harry Potter cast in previous films. He has said of his role as Rufus Scrimgeour that it meant he was no longer the only English actor not to be in Harry Potter.

In 2010 he made a small cameo in Doctor Who, in the episode titled "Vincent and the Doctor".

Nighy voiced Grandsanta in the 2011 CGI animated film Arthur Christmas. In 2012, he starred in The Best Exotic Marigold Hotel, Wrath of the Titans, and the remake of Total Recall. In 2013, he played a role in Darkside, Tom Stoppard's radio drama based on Pink Floyd's album The Dark Side of the Moon.

Nighy played MI5 agent Johnny Worricker in a trilogy of films written and directed by David Hare:
Page Eight (2011), Turks & Caicos (2014), and Salting the Battlefield (2014).

In 2014 he starred with Carey Mulligan in a revival of David Hare's Skylight at Wyndham's Theatre in London's West End. It had a large international audience via broadcast in the National Theatre Live series. He and Mulligan also starred in the play when it was transferred to Broadway in 2015 where they both received Tony Award nominations for their performances. In 2016, he provided the voice of Socrates in the critically panned animated feature Norm of the North.

In 2020 he appeared as Mr Woodhouse, Emma's father, in Autumn de Wilde's Emma (2020) starring alongside Anya Taylor-Joy. The film received near universal acclaim with Variety film critic Andrew Barker praising the casting of Nighy as Emma's father writing that the decision was an "uncontested layup of casting".

In October 2020, it was announced that Nighy would play the leading role in Living, an English-language adaptation of Akira Kurosawa’s 1952 Japanese drama Ikiru, to be directed by Oliver Hermanus from a screenplay by Kazuo Ishiguro. Shooting began in spring 2021 in locations across the UK, including London and Worthing. The film premiered at Sundance in January 2022, where Nighy's performance in particular received high praise.

In the 2022 TV series The Man Who Fell to Earth Nighy played the brilliant Thomas Newton, the first alien to arrive on earth over 40 years ago. This role originally was played by David Bowie in the 1976 film adaptation.

Nighy is also the narrator of the Channel 5 travel show The World's Most Scenic Railway Journeys, a programme which started its fifth series in Autumn 2021 with episodes featuring train journeys across Australia and the Welsh borders.

Radio
Nighy created the endearing character of Charles Paris in at least 13 series of the Charles Paris Mysteries on BBC Radio 4. In 2022, Nighy became a DJ on BBC 6 Music when he stood in for  Guy Garvey on the regular Sunday afternoon programme Guy Garvey's Finest Hour, with Nighy deputising for the Elbow frontman again at the beginning of 2023.

Personal life 
Beginning in 1980, Nighy was in a relationship with English actress Diana Quick, with whom he has a daughter, actress Mary Nighy, born in 1984. The pair separated in 2008.

He has Dupuytren's contracture, a condition which can, depending on the condition's severity, cause contractures of the fingers, most commonly the ring and little fingers.

Nighy is a supporter of Crystal Palace F.C. He is a Patron of the CPSCC (Crystal Palace Children's Charity) and of the Ann Craft Trust. He is also an Honorary Patron of the London children's charity Scene & Heard.

He is a patron of the Milton Rooms, a new arts centre in Malton, North Yorkshire, along with Imelda Staunton, Jools Holland and Kathy Burke.

Nighy is a supporter of the Robin Hood tax campaign and starred in a video in support of it.

Known for his support of total gender equality, Nighy noted in an interview during the 2016 DIFF film festival that the highlighting of gender inequality problems in the film industry had influenced his choice of film roles. He has also spoken of his role in Pride, a film extolling the mutual support between the National Union of Miners and gay rights groups in the UK in the 1980s, as one of his most cherished.

Nighy is noted for his bespoke navy suits. He was listed as one of the 50 best-dressed over-50s by The Guardian in March 2013 and one of GQ 50 best-dressed British men in 2015.

He became a fan of the Pokémon franchise during the production of Detective Pikachu, in which he played Howard Clifford. He has said that Mew is his favourite Pokémon.

Nighy currently resides in Pimlico, London.

Acting credits and accolades

Notes

References

External links

 
 Bill Nighy: A Life in Pictures Interview at BAFTA
 
 
 Silk Sound Books 

1949 births
Living people
20th-century English male actors
21st-century English male actors
Alumni of the Guildford School of Acting
Annie Award winners
Audiobook narrators
Best Actor BAFTA Award (television) winners
Best Miniseries or Television Movie Actor Golden Globe winners
Best Supporting Actor BAFTA Award winners
English male film actors
English male radio actors
English male Shakespearean actors
English male stage actors
English male television actors
English male video game actors
English male voice actors
English people of Irish descent
English people of Scottish descent
Male actors from Surrey
People from Caterham
Theatre World Award winners